The 1940 South Australian Hundred was a motor race staged at the Lobethal Circuit in South Australia on 1 January 1940.
It was held over 12 laps of the 8¾ mile course, a total distance of 100 miles.
The race was contested on a handicap basis with the slowest cars starting first and the fastest last. The "limit man", RS Uffindell (Austin 7), commenced the race 23 minutes before the "virtual scratch man", Alf Barrett (Alfa Romeo Monza).

The race was won by Jack Phillips driving a Ford V8.

Race results

 Race distance: 12 laps, 100 miles
 Starters: 19
 Fastest time: Jack Phillips, 78 min 55 sec, 81.5 mph
 Fastest lap: Alf Barrett, 5 min 48 sec, 92 mph
 Attendance: 25,000
 Weather: Hot, about 102° F

References

External links
 Lobethal (SA) Car Races, The Sydney Morning Herald, Tuesday 2 January 1940, page 9, trove.nla.gov.au
 Lobethal Collection at collections.slsa.sa.gov.au
 Lobethal Race History, www.lobethalgrandcarnival.com.au, as archived at web.archive.org

South Australian Hundred
Motorsport at Lobethal